Gadara ( Gádara), in some texts Gedaris, was an ancient Hellenistic city in what is now Jordan, for a long time member of the Decapolis city league, a former bishopric and present Latin Catholic titular see.

Its ruins are today located at Umm Qais, a small town in the Bani Kinanah Department and Irbid Governorate in Jordan, near its borders with Israel and Syria.

History

Gadara was situated in a defensible position on a ridge accessible to the east but protected by steep falls on the other three sides. It was well-watered, with access to the Ain Qais spring and cisterns.

During the Hellenistic and Roman periods, Gadara was a centre of Greek culture in the region, considered one of its most Hellenised and enjoying special political and religious status.

Hellenistic period
By the third century BC the town was already of some cultural importance. It was the birthplace of the satirist Menippus (3rd century BC), a slave who became a Cynic philosopher and satirised the follies of mankind in a mixture of prose and verse. His works have not survived, but were imitated by Varro and by Lucian.

Philodemus of Gadara was born there, later studied under the Epicurean Scholarch Zeno of Sidon in Athens, and went on to teach Epicurean philosophy to the father-in-law of Caesar at the Villa of the Pisos in Herculaneum (Italy). The scrolls that have been found and deciphered in his library constitute an important testimony of Roman Epicureanism.

In the early first century BC Gadara gave birth to its most famous son, Meleager. He was one of the most admired Hellenistic Greek poets, not only for his own works but also for his anthology of other poets, which formed the basis of the large collection known as the Greek Anthology.

The Greek historian Polybius describes Gadara as being in 218 BC the "strongest of all places in the region". Nevertheless, it capitulated shortly afterwards when besieged by the Seleucid king Antiochus III of Syria. The region passed in and out of the control of the Seleucid kings of Syria and the Ptolemies of Egypt. Gadara was captured and damaged by the Hasmonean king Alexander Jannaeus.

Roman period
In 63 BC, when the Roman general Pompey placed the region under Roman control, rebuilt Gadara and made it one of the semi-autonomous cities of the Roman Decapolis, and a bulwark against Nabataean expansion. But in 30 BC Augustus placed it under the control of the Jewish king Herod. Jewish-Roman historian Josephus relates that after King Herod's death in 4 BC, Gadara was made part of the Roman province of Syria.

Its longest underground section, running for 94 km, is the longest known tunnel from ancient times.

Byzantine and Early Muslim periods
Gadara continued to be an important town within the Eastern Roman Empire, and was long the seat of a Christian bishop.

With the conquest of the Arabs, following the Battle of Yarmouk in 636 it came under Muslim rule. Around 749 it was largely destroyed by an earthquake, and was abandoned.

Gadara in the Gospels

The synoptic Gospels mention the Exorcism of the Gerasene demoniac, with some ancient manuscripts replacing Gerasene with Gadarene or Gergesene.

Ecclesiastical history
Ancient Gadara was important enough to become a suffragan bishopric of the Metropolitan Archbishopric of Scythopolis, the capital of the Roman province of Palestina Secunda, but it faded with the city after the Muslim conquest.

Titular see
The diocese was nominally restored no later than the 15th century as Titular bishopric of Gadaræ in Latin of Gadara in Curiate Italian, from 1925 renamed solely Gadara.

It is vacant, having had the following incumbents, all of the fitting episcopal (lowest) rank :
 Johann Erler, Friars Minor (O.F.M.) (1432.07.12 – 1469)
 Matthias Kanuti, Benedictine Order (O.S.B.) (1492.07.09 – 1506)
 Domingo Pérez Rivera (1741.03.06 – 1771.11.12)
 Jan Benisławski, Jesuits (S.J.) (1783 – 1812.03.25)
 Anton Gottfried Claessen (1844.07.25 – 1847.09.29)
 Joseph-Hyacinthe Sohier, Paris Foreign Missions Society (M.E.P.) (1850.08.27 – 1876.09.03)
 Edward MacCabe (1877.06.26 – 1879.04.04) (later Cardinal)
 Giuseppe Macchi (1880.02.27 – 1889.04.03) (later Archbishop)
 Giuseppe Schirò (1889.07.30 – 1895.11.29) (later Archbishop)
 Nicolae Iosif Camilli, Conventual Franciscans (O.F.M. Conv.) (1896.02.25 – 1901.03.27) (later Archbishop)
 Venceslao  (1901.07.15 – 1932.09.02)
 Martial-Pierre-Marie Jannin, M.E.P. (1933.01.10 – 1940.07.16)
 Jean Cassaigne, M.E.P. (1941.02.20 – 1973.10.31)

Notable inhabitants

Gadara was once called the "city of philosophers". David Sider notes that Gadara was produced numerous remarkable philosophers, writers and mathematicians, but in spite of that and of being large enough to boast two theatres, it saw all its famous sons move to Greece and Italy in search of career opportunities. Among others, Gadara was home to (chronologically):
Menippus of Gadara (3rd century BC), Cynic satirist
Meleager of Gadara (1st century BC), Cynic philosopher and poet
Philodemus of Gadara (1st century BC), Epicurean philosopher and poet
Theodorus of Gadara (1st century BC), orator
Demetrius of Gadara (1st century BC), the most important, influential and well-known freedman of the Pompey Magnus.
Philo of Gadara (early 2nd century AD), mathematician, calculated a highly accurate value for π
Oenomaus of Gadara (2nd century AD), Cynic philosopher
Apsines of Gadara (3rd century AD), rhetorician

Rediscovery
Umm Qais was recognised by Ulrich Seetzen in 1806 as the ancient site of Gadara.

Description
The ancient walls may now be traced in almost their entire circuit of 3 km. One of the Roman roads ran eastward to Ḍer‛ah; and an aqueduct has been traced to the pool of Ḳhab, about 20 miles to the north of Ḍer‛ah. The ruins include those of "baths, two theaters, a hippodrome, colonnaded streets and, under the Romans, aqueducts," a temple, a basilica and other buildings, telling of a once splendid city. A paved street, with double colonnade, ran from east to west. The ruts worn in the paved road by the wheels of ancient vehicles are still to be seen.

In 2017, archaeologists discovered an ancient temple that was built in the Hellenistic era in the 3rd century BC. The temple is believed to have been dedicated to Poseidon. Hellenistic pottery was also found on the site. The temple, built following the design of distyle in antis, consists of a pronaos, a podium and a naos, the holy chamber of the temple.

Archaeologists have also discovered a network of water tunnels at the centre of the ancient town, which are separated from the external tunnel that was discovered decades ago in the area.

Tourism

The formerly residence of the Ottoman governor known as Beit Rousan ("Rousan House") serves as a visitor centre and museum, where numerous archaeological finding from Gadara are on display.

References

Citations

General bibliography 
Holm-Nielson, Svend, "Gadarenes", in Anchor Bible Dictionary vol. 2, ed. D.N. Freedman (1992. New York: Doubleday)
Laney, J. Carl, Geographical Aspects of the Life of Christ [Unpublished Th.D. dissertation, Dallas Theological Seminary ] (1977)
Nun, Mendel, Gergesa (Kursi) (1989 Kibbutz Ein Gev)
Nun, Mendel, Ports of Galilee, in Biblical Archaeology Review; 25/4: 18 (1999)

Weber, Thomas, Umm Qais: Gadara of the Decapolis (1989. Amman: Economic Press Co.)
This entry incorporates text from the International Standard Bible Encyclopedia with some modernisation.

External links

GCatholic - (titular) bishopric
Irbid Guide (in Arabic)
Greater Irbid Municipality 
Irbid news 
History and pictures

Archaeological sites in Jordan
Ancient Greek archaeological sites in Western Asia
Catholic titular sees in Asia
Decapolis
Hellenistic colonies
New Testament cities